Miloš Krstić (born 7 March 1987) is a Serbian professional footballer who plays as midfielder for OFK Beograd.

Club career

Early career
Krstić first began training with Partizan's youth academy before moving to Čukarički's youth team. In 2005, having played in Čukarički's youth system, Krstić trialled with Chelsea as an 18-year-old, although did not sign a contract with them. Krstić made his professional debut with FK Rad after which he signed for Olympique de Marseille in 2007. Initially he succeeded in Marseille's reserve side and was recognized as a good prospect. He was loaned out to Ajaccio in 2008, with whom he appeared in seven Ligue 2 matches.

OFK Beograd
In 2009, Krstić returned to Serbia and signed with OFK Beograd. He played in one of the most accomplished generation of OFK players in recent years, as the team finished in third place only behind Partizan and Red Star at the end of the 2009-10 season. In the summer of 2011, he became a transfer target of Red Star Belgrade.

Jagodina
On January 25, 2012, Krstić signed for FK Jagodina on a two-year contract. Krstić scored a total of seven goals in the Jelen SuperLiga while with Jagodina. He only played for a half-season up to summer of 2012, when it was announced that Krstić travelled to South Korea to respond to offers from Incheon United FC, Suwon Samsung Bluewings, and Daegu FC.

Thun
On June 29, 2012, he signed for FC Thun on a three-year contract, with an undisclosed fee paid to FK Jagodina. Before making his season debut he broke his fibula and had to wait until the winter to return to competition form.

Radnički Niš
Krstić signed for FK Radnički Niš on February 5, 2014.

Nea Salamina
On August 30, 2014 he signed for Nea Salamina.

Return to OFK Beograd
In January 2020, Krstić returned to OFK Beograd for the third time.

References

External links
 Player profile at Olympique de Marseille official website.
 Player profile at Sky Sports.
 Player profile at Reuters.
 Miloš Krstić Stats at Utakmica.rs

1987 births
Living people
People from Svrljig
Serbian footballers
Serbian expatriate footballers
FK Rad players
Olympique de Marseille players
AC Ajaccio players
Expatriate footballers in France
OFK Beograd players
FK Jagodina players
FC Thun players
FK Radnički Niš players
FK Novi Pazar players
FK Sinđelić Beograd players
Serbian SuperLiga players
Association football midfielders
Nea Salamis Famagusta FC players
Cypriot First Division players
Expatriate footballers in Cyprus
Expatriate footballers in Switzerland
Serbian expatriate sportspeople in Cyprus
Serbian expatriate sportspeople in France
Serbian expatriate sportspeople in Hungary
Expatriate footballers in Hungary
Diósgyőri VTK players
Nemzeti Bajnokság I players